Sawbones: A Marital Tour of Misguided Medicine is a weekly, comedic medical podcast hosted by Dr. Sydnee McElroy and her husband, podcaster Justin McElroy. The show is distributed online by Maximum Fun.

In each episode, Sydnee discusses an element of historical medical practice, while Justin provides a comedic foil. The show normally focuses on antiquated medical practices that are unusual to modern listeners, but occasionally covers rare and unusual disorders and occurrences.

History

Background and formation 
Sydnee and Justin McElroy had previously worked together on a short podcast series entitled Losing the Sheen, focused on watching Two and a Half Men.  The show only lasted nine episodes before the two became tired of it, instead starting a medical podcast based on Sydnee's expertise. While developing the idea for the show, the McElroys decided that it would be irresponsible for them to give medical advice to listeners, even with Sydnee's background. They opted instead to focus on the historical aspects, which had been an interest of Sydnee's. Like other shows by the family, such as My Brother, My Brother and Me, Sawbones is distributed via the Maximum Fun network.

Sawbones has aired over 400 episodes with content on "medical history to uncover all the odd, weird, wrong, dumb and just gross ways we've tried to fix people over the years."

Sawbones Live 
Sawbones has on occasion been performed live, such as the November 2, 2017, performance at the Keith-Albee Performing Arts Center in Huntington, WV.

Live performances 

 Episode 44: "Warts". New York City, People's Improv Theater. May 27, 2014.
 Episode 54: "Spontaneous Combustion". August 26, 2014.
 Episode 69: "Appalachian Folk Medicine". December 23, 2014.
 Episode 102: "Birds". Seattle, WA. September 2, 2015.
 Episode 103: "Cats". Vancouver, British Columbia. September 10, 2015.
 Episode 117: "Christmas is Trying to Kill You". Huntington, WV Candlenights 2015. December 23, 2015.
 Episode 140: "Pliny the Elder". New York City, PlayStation Theater. June 8, 2016.
 Episode 146: "Tea". Boston, MA Wilbur Theater. July 21, 2016.
 Episode 167: "Santa is Sick". Live from Candlenights 2016. December 24, 2016.
 Sawbones live, 2017 Marshall University 30th Anniversary Yeager Society Symposium. November 2, 2017.
 Episode 177. "Norovirus". March 16, 2017.
 Episode 187. "The Clap". Austin, TX. May 25, 2017.
 Episode 195. "The Mütter Museum". Philadelphia, PA. July 19, 2017.
 Episode 212: "Coffee". Live in Seattle, WA. December 15, 2017.
 Episode 229: "Hepatitis A". Live at the Columbus Podcast Festival. May 18, 2018.
 Episode 257: "A Sawbones Special Presentation: A Medicine Called Christmas". Live from Candlenights 2018. December 24, 2018
 Episode 270: "Pinworms". Live on the Joco Cruise 2019. April 7, 2019.
 Episode 283: "The Chattanooga Medicine Company". July 19, 2019.
 Episode 289: "Hydrotherapy". Atlanta, GA. September 8, 2019.

The Horrifying, Hilarious Road To Modern Medicine 
In June 2018, a book adaptation of the podcast was announced, under the title The Sawbones Book: The Horrifying, Hilarious Road To Modern Medicine. Published by Weldon Owen, the book became available in October 2018. The book showed up in the top 10 Audible bestsellers for the week ending April 5, 2019. The book was illustrated by Sydnee's sibling, Teylor Smirl.

See also 

 List of history podcasts
List of health and wellness podcasts

References

External links 

 Official website
 Sawbones on the official McElroy family website

Audio podcasts
Comedy and humor podcasts
Science podcasts
2013 podcast debuts
Maximum Fun
Physicians from West Virginia
History podcasts
Podcasts adapted for other media
Health and wellness podcasts